The Grothendieck construction (named after Alexander Grothendieck) is a construction used in the mathematical field of category theory.

Definition
Let  be a functor from any small category to the category of small categories.

Slogan 
"The Grothendieck construction takes structured, tabulated data and flattens it by throwing it all into one big space. The projection functor is then tasked with remembering which box each datum originally came from."

Example
If  is a group, then it can be viewed as a category,  with one object and all morphisms invertible. The requirement that  be a functor is then equivalent to specifying a group homomorphism  where  denotes the group of automorphisms of   Finally, the Grothendieck construction,  results in a category with one object, which can again be viewed as a group, and in this case, the resulting group is (isomorphic to) the semidirect product

See also
 Category of elements

References
 Mac Lane and Moerdijk, Sheaves in Geometry and Logic, pp. 44.
  R. W. Thomason (1979). Homotopy colimits in the category of small categories. Mathematical Proceedings of the Cambridge Philosophical Society, 85, pp 91–109. doi:10.1017/S0305004100055535.

Specific

External links
 

Category theory